This article presents a timeline of events in the history of computer operating systems from 1951 to the current day. For a narrative explaining the overall developments, see the History of operating systems.

1950s
 1951
 LEO I 'Lyons Electronic Office' was the commercial development of EDSAC computing platform, supported by British firm J. Lyons and Co.
 1955
 MIT's Tape Director operating system made for UNIVAC 1103
 1955
 General Motors Operating System made for IBM 701
 1956
 GM-NAA I/O for IBM 704, based on General Motors Operating System
 1957
 Atlas Supervisor (Manchester University)  (Atlas computer project start)
 BESYS (Bell Labs), for IBM 704, later IBM 7090 and IBM 7094
 1958
 University of Michigan Executive System (UMES), for IBM 704, 709, and 7090
 1959
 SHARE Operating System (SOS), based on GM-NAA I/O

1960s
 1960
 IBSYS (IBM for its 7090 and 7094)
 1961
 CTSS demonstration (MIT's Compatible Time-Sharing System for the IBM 7094)
 MCP (Burroughs Master Control Program)
 1962
 Atlas Supervisor (Manchester University)  (Atlas computer commissioned)
 BBN Time-Sharing System
 GCOS (GE's General Comprehensive Operating System, originally GECOS, General Electric Comprehensive Operating Supervisor)
 1963
 AN/FSQ-32, another early time-sharing system begun
 CTSS becomes operational (MIT's Compatible Time-Sharing System for the IBM 7094)
 JOSS, an interactive time-shared system that did not distinguish between operating system and language
 Titan Supervisor, early time-sharing system begun
 1964
 Berkeley Timesharing System (for Scientific Data Systems' SDS 940)
 Dartmouth Time Sharing System (Dartmouth College's DTSS for GE computers)
 EXEC 8 (UNIVAC)
 KDF9 Timesharing Director (English Electric) – an early, fully hardware secured, fully pre-emptive process switching, multi-programming operating system for KDF9 (originally announced in 1960)
 OS/360 (IBM's primary OS for its S/360 series) (announced)
 PDP-6 Monitor (DEC) descendant renamed TOPS-10 in 1970
 SCOPE (CDC 3000 series)
 1965
 BOS/360 (IBM's Basic Operating System)
 TOS/360 (IBM's Tape Operating System)
 Livermore Time Sharing System (LTSS)
 Multics (MIT, GE, Bell Labs for the GE-645) (announced)
 Pick operating system
 THE multiprogramming system (Technische Hogeschool Eindhoven) development
 TSOS (later VMOS) (RCA)
 1966
 DOS/360 (IBM's Disk Operating System)
 GEORGE 1 & 2 for ICT 1900 series
 MS/8 (Richard F. Lary's DEC PDP-8 system)
 OS/360 (IBM's primary OS for its S/360 series) PCP and MFT (shipped)
 RAX
 Remote Users of Shared Hardware (RUSH), a time-sharing system developed by Allen-Babcock for the 360/50
 SODA for Elwro's Odra 1204
 Universal Time-Sharing System (XDS Sigma series)
 1967
 CP-40, predecessor to CP-67 on modified IBM System/360 Model 40
 CP-67 (IBM, also known as CP/CMS)
 Conversational Programming System (CPS), an IBM time-sharing system under OS/360
 Michigan Terminal System (MTS) (time-sharing system for the IBM S/360-67 and successors)
 ITS (MIT's Incompatible Timesharing System for the DEC PDP-6 and PDP-10)
 OS/360 MVT
 ORVYL (Stanford University's time-sharing system for the IBM S/360-67)
 TSS/360 (IBM's Time-sharing System for the S/360-67, never officially released, canceled in 1969 and again in 1971)
 WAITS (SAIL, Stanford Artificial Intelligence Laboratory, time-sharing system for DEC PDP-6 and PDP-10, later TOPS-10)
 1968
 Airline Control Program (ACP) (IBM)
 CALL/360, an IBM time-sharing system for System/360
 THE multiprogramming system (Eindhoven University of Technology) publication
 TSS/8 (DEC for the PDP-8)
 VP/CSS
 1969
 GEORGE 3 For ICL 1900 series
 Multics (MIT, GE, Bell Labs for the GE-645 and later the Honeywell 6180) (opened for paying customers in October)
 RC 4000 Multiprogramming System (RC)
 TENEX (Bolt, Beranek and Newman for DEC systems, later TOPS-20)
 Unics (later Unix) (AT&T, initially on DEC computers)
 Xerox Operating System

1970s
 1970
 DOS-11 (PDP-11)
 1971
 EMAS
 Kronos
 RSTS-11 2A-19 (First released version; PDP-11)
 OS/8
 1972
 COS-300
 Data General RDOS
 Edos
 MUSIC/SP
 Operating System/Virtual Storage 1 (OS/VS1)
 Operating System/Virtual Storage 2 R1 (OS/VS2 SVS)
 PRIMOS (written in FORTRAN IV, that didn't have pointers, while later versions, around version 18, written in a version of PL/I, called PL/P)
 Virtual Machine/Basic System Extensions Program Product (BSEPP or VM/SE)
 Virtual Machine/System Extensions Program Product (SEPP or VM/BSE)
 Virtual Machine Facility/370 (VM/370), sometimes known as VM/CMS
 1973
 Эльбрус-1 (Elbrus-1) – Soviet computer – created using high-level language uЭль-76 (AL-76/ALGOL 68)
 Alto OS
 CP-V (Control Program V)
 RSX-11D
 RT-11
 VME – implementation language S3 (ALGOL 68)
 1974
CP/M
DOS-11 V09-20C (Last stable release, June 1974)
 MONECS
 Multi-Programming Executive (MPE) – Hewlett-Packard
 Hydra – capability-based, multiprocessing OS kernel
 Operating System/Virtual Storage 2 R2 (MVS)
 Sintran III
 1975
 BS2000 V2.0 (First released version)
 COS-350
 NOS (Control Data Corporation)
 Version 6 Unix
 1976
 Cambridge CAP computer – all operating system procedures written in ALGOL 68C, with some closely associated protected procedures in BCPL
 Cray Operating System
 FLEX
 TOPS-20
 Tandem Nonstop OS v1
 1977
 1BSD
 KERNAL
 OASIS operating system
 OS68
 OS4000
 System Support Program (IBM System/34 and System/36)
 TRSDOS
 Virtual Memory System (VMS) V1.0 (Initial commercial release, October 25)
 1978
 2BSD
 Apple DOS
 Control Program Facility (IBM System/38)
 Cray Time Sharing System (CTSS)
 HDOS
 KSOS – secure OS design from Ford Aerospace
 KVM/370 – security retro-fit of IBM VM/370
 Lisp machine (CADR)
 MVS/System Extensions (MVS/SE)
 PTDOS
 TRIPOS
 UCSD p-System (First released version)
 1979
 Atari DOS
 3BSD
 Idris
 MP/M
 MVS/System Extensions R2 (MVS/SE2)
 NLTSS
 POS
 Sinclair BASIC
 UCLA Secure UNIX – an early secure UNIX OS based on security kernel
 UNIX/32V
 Version 7 Unix

1980s
 1980
 86-DOS
 AOS/VS (Data General)
 Business Operating System
 CTOS
 MVS/System Product (MVS/SP) V1
 NewDos/80
 OS-9
 RS-DOS
 SOS
 Virtual Machine/System Product (VM/SP)
 Xenix
 1981
 Acorn MOS
 Aegis SR1 (First Apollo/DOMAIN systems shipped on March 27)
 CP/M-86
 iMAX – OS for Intel's iAPX 432 capability machine
 MS-DOS
 PC DOS
 Pilot (Xerox Star operating system)
 UNOS
 UTS
 Xinu first release
 1982
 Commodore DOS
 LDOS (By Logical Systems, Inc. – for the Radio Shack TRS-80 Models I, II & III)
 pSOS
 QNX
 Stratus VOS
 Sun UNIX (later SunOS) 0.7
 Ultrix
 Unix System III
 1983
 Coherent
 DNIX
 EOS
 GNU (project start)
 Lisa Office System 7/7
 LOCUS – UNIX compatible, high reliability, distributed OS
 MVS/System Product V2 (MVS/Extended Architecture, MVS/XA)
 Novell NetWare (S-Net)
 ProDOS
 STOP – TCSEC A1-class, secure OS for SCOMP hardware
 SunOS 1.0
 1984
 AMSDOS
 Mac OS (System 1.0)
 MSX-DOS
 PC/IX
 Sinclair QDOS
 QNX
 UNICOS
 Venix 2.0
 Virtual Machine/Extended Architecture Migration Assistance (VM/XA MA)
 1985
 AmigaOS
 Atari TOS
 DG/UX
 DOS Plus
 Graphics Environment Manager
 MIPS RISC/os
 Oberon – written in Oberon
 SunOS 2.0
 Version 8 Unix
 Virtual Machine/Extended Architecture System Facility (VM/XA SF)
 Windows 1.0
 Windows 1.01 
 Xenix 2.0
 1986
 AIX 1.0
 Cronus distributed OS
 GEMSOS – TCSEC A1-class, secure kernel for BLACKER VPN & GTNP
 GEOS
 GS-OS
 Genera 7.0
 HP-UX
 SunOS 3.0
 Version 9 Unix
 1987
 Arthur (much improved version came in 1989 under the name RISC OS)
 BS2000 V9.0
 IRIX (3.0 is first SGI version)
 MDOS
 MINIX 1.0
 OS/2 (1.0)
 PC-MOS/386
 Topaz – semi-distributed OS for DEC Firefly workstation written in Modula-2+ and garbage collected
 Windows 2.0 
 1988
 A/UX (Apple Computer)
 AOS/VS II (Data General)
 CP/M rebranded as DR-DOS
 Flex machine – tagged, capability machine with OS and other software written in ALGOL 68RS
 HeliOS 1.0
 KeyKOS – capability-based microkernel for IBM mainframes with automated persistence of app data
 LynxOS
 Mac OS (System 6)
 MVS/System Product V3 (MVS/Enterprise Systems Architecture, MVS/ESA)
 OS/2 (1.1)
 OS/400
 RISC iX
 SpartaDOS X
 SunOS 4.0
 TOPS-10 7.04 (Last stable release, July 1988)
 Virtual Machine/Extended Architecture System Product (VM/XA SP)
 VAX VMM – TCSEC A1-class, VMM for VAX computers (limited use before cancellation)
 1989
 Army Secure Operating System (ASOS) – TCSEC A1-class secure, real-time OS for Ada applications
 TSX-32
 Version 10 Unix
 Xenix 2.3.4 (Last stable release)

1990s
 1990
 AIX 3.0
 AmigaOS 2.0
 BeOS (v1)
 DOS/V
 Genera 8.0
 iS-DOS
 LOCK – TCSEC A1-class secure system with kernel & hardware support for type enforcement
 MVS/ESA SP Version 4 
 Novell NetWare 3
 OS/2 1.3
 OSF/1
 PC/GEOS
 Windows 3.0 
 Virtual Machine/Enterprise Systems Architecture (VM/XA ESA)
 1991
 Amoeba – microkernel-based, POSIX-compliant, distributed OS
 Linux 0.01-0.1
 Mac OS (System 7)
 MINIX 1.5
 PenPoint OS
 RISC OS 3
 SUNMOS
 Trusted Xenix – rewritten & security enhanced Xenix evaluated at TCSEC B2-class
 1992
 386BSD 0.1
 Amiga Unix 2.01 (Latest stable release)
 AmigaOS 3.0
 BSD/386, by BSDi and later known as BSD/OS.
 LGX
 OpenVMS V1.0 (First OpenVMS AXP (Alpha) specific version, November 1992)
 OS/2 2.0 (First i386 32-bit based version)
 Plan 9 First Edition (First public release was made available to universities)
 RSTS/E 10.1 (Last stable release, September 1992)
 SLS
 Solaris 2.0 (Successor to SunOS 4.x; based on SVR4 instead of BSD)
 Windows 3.1 
 1993
 IBM 4690 Operating System
 FreeBSD
 NetBSD
 Novell NetWare 4
 Newton OS
 Open Genera 1.0
 OS/2 2.1
 Slackware 1.0
 Spring
 Windows NT 3.1 (First Windows NT kernel public release)
 1994
 AIX 4.0, 4.1
 IBM MVS/ESA SP Version 5 
 NetBSD 1.0 (First multi-platform release, October 1994)
 OS/2 3.0
 Red Hat
 RISC OS 3.5
 SPIN – extensible OS written in Modula-3
 1995
 Digital UNIX (aka Tru64 UNIX)
 OpenBSD
 OS/390
 Plan 9 Second Edition (Commercial second release version was made available to the general public.)
 Ultrix 4.5 (Last major release)
 Windows 95
 1996
 AIX 4.2
 Debian 1.1
 JN – microkernel OS for embedded, Java apps
 Mac OS 7.6 (First officially-named Mac OS)
 OS/2 4.0
 Palm OS
 RISC OS 3.6
 Windows NT 4.0
 Windows CE 1.0
 1997
 AIX 4.3
 DR-WebSpyder 1.0
 Inferno
 Mac OS 8
 MINIX 2.0
 Nemesis
 RISC OS 3.7
 SkyOS
 Windows CE 2.0
 1998
 DR-WebSpyder 2.0
 Junos
 Novell NetWare 5
 RT-11 5.7 (Last stable release, October 1998)
 Solaris 7 (first 64-bit Solaris release – names from this point drop "2.", otherwise would've been Solaris 2.7)
 Windows 98
 1999
 AROS (Boot for the first time in Stand Alone version)
 Inferno Second Edition (Last distribution (Release 2.3) from Lucent's Inferno Business Unit)
 Mac OS 9
 OS/2 4.5
 RISC OS 4
 Windows 98 (2nd edition)

2000s

2010s

2020s

See also
 Comparison of operating systems
 List of operating systems
 Comparison of real-time operating systems
 Timeline of DOS operating systems
 Timeline of Linux distributions (Diagram 1992–2010)

References

External links
 UNIX History – a timeline of UNIX 1969 and its descendants at present
 Concise Microsoft O.S. Timeline – a color-coded concise timeline for various Microsoft operating systems (1981–present)
Full Form of Computer - Full Form and Working of Computers.
 Bitsavers – an effort to capture, salvage, and archive historical computer software and manuals from minicomputers and mainframes of the 1950s, 1960s, 1970s, and 1980s
 A brief history of operating systems
 Microsoft operating system time-line

Timeline of operating systems
Operating systems
Operating systems
Real-time operating systems
Embedded operating systems